Thomas Tsitas (Greek: Θωμάς Τσίτας; born 30 July 1991) is a Greek professional footballer who plays as a striker for Iraklis Ampelokipi.

Club career

Early life and career
Tsitas was born in Giannitsa and started his career playing for Athlitiki Akadimia Giannitson. In the summer of 2007, after his club's president offered him to Iraklis, he signed for Iraklis F.C. and joined the club's under 17 squad. In his first season with Iraklis U-17, the 2008–2009 season, he scored a total of 20 goals. On 29 March 2010 Tsitas went on trial to PSV Eindhoven, but as he lacked a permission from Iraklis to do so, he was forced to come back. Tsitas continued his goalscoring trends with Iraklis U-20 by scoring over 20 goals per season, to force his way into the first team.

Iraklis
Tsitas signed a professional contract for Iraklis in January 2011. He debuted for Iraklis on 29 January 2011, as he came in for Karim Soltani, in the 83rd minute of a 0–0 home draw against Kerkyra.

AEK Athens
In August 2011 Tsitas signed a 3-year contract after being a free agent with his new team A.E.K. Athens. On 4 December 2011 Tsitas made his debut for AEK Athens, in the game against Kerkyra F.C. as a substitution.

Niki Volos
In July 2013 Tsitas signed a professional contract for Greek Football League club Niki Volos.

International career
Tsitas debuted for Greece U-19 on 13 November 2009, in a friendly 3–3 draw against France U-19. Tsitas was a 65th-minute substitute and six minutes later he even managed to score his first goal for the team. His last appearance to date for the team, was in a friendly match against Aspropyrgos. He played his first match for Greece U-21 on 9 February 2011 against Germany U-21.

Personal life
Tsitas is a student in the department of Economics of the University of Thessaly.

References

External links
 Soccerway Profile
 Myplayer.gr Profile

1991 births
Living people
Greek footballers
Greece youth international footballers
Greek expatriate footballers
Expatriate footballers in Cyprus
Greek expatriates in Cyprus
Super League Greece players
Football League (Greece) players
Cypriot Second Division players
Iraklis Thessaloniki F.C. players
AEK Athens F.C. players
Niki Volos F.C. players
Paniliakos F.C. players
Kallithea F.C. players
Anagennisi Karditsa F.C. players
PAEEK players
Enosis Neon Paralimni FC players
Omonia Aradippou players
Othellos Athienou F.C. players
Association football forwards
Greece under-21 international footballers
Footballers from Giannitsa